Tyson Caiado (sometimes spelled Ciado, born 22 August 1988) is an Indian footballer who plays as a goalkeeper for Goan United FC in the Middlesex County Football League.

Career

Dempo
Despite playing for the first-team of Dempo S.C. in the Goa Professional League for many years Caiado did not make his I-League and professional debut for Dempo till 10 November 2012 against Shillong Lajong F.C. after first choice goalkeeper Subhasish Roy Chowdhury went out injured in the 79th minute of play; Dempo won the match 4–1 in the end with Caiado not conceding any goals after he came on. He then made his full debut for the club and his career on 24 November 2012 against Air India at the Fatorda Stadium and even kept the clean-sheet as Dempo won 1–0.

East Bengal
In August 2014 Tyson signed for East Bengal F.C. after failing to make a single appearance for Dempo S.C. in 2013–14 season.

Career statistics

Club

See also
 List of Indian football players in foreign leagues

References

External links
 Tyson Caiado at Goal.com
 
 

Indian footballers
1988 births
Living people
I-League players
Dempo SC players
East Bengal Club players
Footballers from Goa
Association football goalkeepers
Indian expatriate footballers
Indian expatriate sportspeople in England
Indian expatriate sportspeople in the United Kingdom